Kalan may refer to: 

 The sea otter, also called kalan, a large otter native to the North Pacific
 Kalan Müzik, Kalan Music, Istanbul, Turkish independent record label of ethnic and folk music

People
 Elliott Kalan (born 1981), U.S. comedy writer and comedian
 Kalan Haywood (born 1999), American politician
 Kalan Porter (born 1985), or just "Kalan", singer, a winner of TV show Canadian Idol

Places
 Kalan (Turkey), name until 1936 of the Dersim Province capital, now Tunceli
 Kalan (France), original Breton name of the Bretagne town of Calan, Morbihan
 Kalán, Hungarian name for the town of Călan, Hunedoara County, Romania
 Kalan, Ardabil, a village in Ardabil Province, Iran
 Kalan, Kaleybar, a village in East Azerbaijan Province, Iran
 Kalan, Varzaqan, a village in East Azerbaijan Province, Iran
 Kalan, Ilam, a village in Ilam Province, Iran
 Kalan, Lorestan, a village in Lorestan Province, Iran
 Kalan, Qazvin, a village in Qazvin Province, Iran
 Kollan, Dalgan, a village in Sistan and Baluchestan Province, Iran
 Kalan, Tehran, a village in Tehran Province, Iran
 Kalan Rural District, an administrative subdivision in Ilam Province, Iran
 Kalan, Mughal word used in India and Pakistan for "big", administrative suffix or prefix for places:
 In Pakistan, such as Birote Kalan or Dholla Kalan
 In India, such as Uppal Kalan or Kalan Wali

See also

 Kaalan, an Indian dish
 Gerald Kallan (born 1979), Austrian luger

And:

 Calan Mai, in Wales, name of 1 May, a holiday
 Calan Gaeaf, in Wales, name of 1 November, first day of winter
 Hyacinth Marie de Lalande de Calan (19th century), Governor General for French Indies